Duster is an upcoming crime thriller television series created by J. J. Abrams and LaToya Morgan. It is due to air on the HBO Max streaming service.

Premise
The first black FBI agent teams with a getaway driver to take down a major crime syndicate operating in the Southwest in 1972.

Cast
 Josh Holloway
 Rachel Hilson as Nina
 Keith David as Ezra
 Sydney Elisabeth
 Greg Grunberg
 Camille Guaty
 Asivak Koostachin
 Adriana Aluna Martinez
 Benjamin Charles Watson
 Gail O'Grady as Charlotte Dean-Ellis
 Donal Logue as Sergeant Groomes
 Kevin Chamberlin as Bob Temple

Production
The series was given a straight to series green-light at HBO Max in April 2020, as part of J. J. Abrams overall deal at WarnerMedia. Abrams will co-write the series with LaToya Morgan.

In March 2021, Josh Holloway was cast to star in the pilot, with filming beginning in October 2021 in Tucson. In February 2023, the series was officially given a series order, with Rachel Hilson among the cast additions to the series.

References

External links
Duster at the Internet Movie Database

HBO Max original programming
Television series by Warner Bros. Television Studios
American crime television series
Television series set in 1972